 

The Vetter Fairing Company was a manufacturer of motorcycle accessories including the Windjammer series of motorcycle fairings. The business was founded by Craig Vetter in 1966, sold in 1978, and went bankrupt in 1983. Bell-Riddell Inc. acquired the assets, and produced fairings for a few years.

Notes and references

Notes

References

External links
 Craig Vetter's web site

Automotive companies established in 1966
Manufacturing companies disestablished in 1983
Craig Vetter
Motorcycle parts manufacturers
1966 establishments in Illinois
1983 disestablishments in Illinois